Jay Holt (June 15, 1923 – March 26, 2012) was an American wrestler. He competed in the men's Greco-Roman welterweight at the 1956 Summer Olympics.

References

External links
 

1923 births
2012 deaths
American male sport wrestlers
Olympic wrestlers of the United States
Wrestlers at the 1956 Summer Olympics
Sportspeople from San Francisco